Shell is a 2012 independent drama film directed by Scott Graham.  It stars Chloe Pirrie as Shell, a 17-year-old girl who lives and works at a petrol station in the remote Scottish Highlands. The film is a broader adaptation of a previous work by Scott Graham entitled with the same name released in 2007.

Plot 
Shell lives at a remote petrol station in the highlands with her father, Pete (who is epileptic). Adam (a regular customer about Shell's age) works at the local sawmill. Pete has an epileptic seizure.
When Pete returns home from taking a car to the scrapyard there is a charged encounter between him and Shell. That night, when the heating fails, Shell climbs into bed with her father.

Next morning, Hugh (a regular, older, customer) returns bearing a gift of clothing for Shell. There is another charged encounter. After Hugh leaves, Shell approaches her father again as he repairs the heater.

Adam arrives to invite Shell out. He has lost his job due to being suspected of a break-in at the sawmill. He describes some of his own family issues and says he is considering setting up a similar operation to Pete's, or working with Pete, but Pete rebuffs him. Adam and Shell drive off and have sex in Adam's car.

A young mother and child stop off to use the petrol station's toilets and the child leaves her doll behind. Shell runs off after the car to catch them. Pete sees she is not in the petrol station, and stares along the road (towards the spread-out village of Dundonnell and the Sail Mhòr outlying peak of An Teallach). Shell is lying in the roadside heather, against a backdrop of the loch and the craggy Beinn Ghobhlach, and Pete can't see her. Shell returns to the petrol station to find Pete having another fit. While convulsing, he bites Shell badly. As he recovers from his fit, they kiss, then fall asleep together. When he wakes up, Pete sees the cut on her hand and bruises on her legs (from her encounter with Adam), gets up and throws himself under the wheels of a passing lorry.

Adam comforts Shell and they sleep together. In the morning, a lorry arrives for fuel and Shell goes off with the driver, without plans of where to go. The closing credits roll over shots of the Destitution Road.

Cast
 Chloe Pirrie as Shell
Michael Smiley as Hugh
Joseph Mawle as Pete
Iain De Caestecker as Adam
 Paul Hickey as Robert
Kate Dickie as Clare
Morven Christie as Young Mother
Tam Dean Burn as Trucker

Filming

In 2011, filming began on location in the Scottish Highlands near the village of Badcaul, situated beside the sea loch Little Loch Broom. For the film, Production Designer Jamie Lapsley designed a purpose built garage which was constructed on a viewpoint overlooking the loch and the spectacular Beinn Ghobhlach on the peninsula opposite. The Destitution Road footage was shot near Fain.

Critical reaction
Before its release Shell was nominated for three awards at the 2012 BFI London Film Festival, including the Best Newcomer award for lead Chloe Pirrie. Director Scott Graham is nominated for the BAFTA Award for Outstanding Debut by a British Writer, Director or Producer at the 67th British Academy Film Awards.

References

External links
 
 
 Jamie Lapsley
 Sail Mhòr at www.walkhighlands.co.uk

2012 films
Films set in Scotland
Scottish films
British independent films
2010s English-language films
2010s British films